Ridley Railway Bridge is a railway bridge carrying the Tyne Valley line between  and  across the River South Tyne near Ridley Hall in Northumberland.

History
The first bridge near Ridley Hall for the railway between Newcastle upon Tyne and Carlisle was designed by John Blackmore and originally built of timber; it was completed in 1838 but as the condition of the wood deteriorated it was replaced by the current iron-girder structure constructed by Sir William Arrol & Co. in 1907.

References

Railway bridges in Northumberland
Crossings of the River Tyne